Toveyleh-ye Yebareh (also Romanized as Ţoveyleh-ye Yebāreh) is a village in Gheyzaniyeh Rural District, in the Central District of Ahvaz County, Khuzestan Province, Iran. At the 2006 census, its population was 42, in 8 families.

References 

Populated places in Ahvaz County